The 1975 Volta a Catalunya was the 55th edition of the Volta a Catalunya cycle race and was held from 3 to 10 September 1975. The race started in Santa Coloma de Gramanet and finished in Tarrasa. The race was won by Fausto Bertoglio of the  team.

General classification

References

1975
Volta
1975 in Spanish road cycling
September 1975 sports events in Europe